Sabry is a surname. Notable people with the surname include:

Mohammed al-Sabry, Yemeni politician and an opposition leader
Sabry Mohammed, held in the United States' Guantanamo Bay detention camps since January 2002
Hassan Sabry Pasha (1879–1940), Egyptian politician who briefly served as prime minister of Egypt in 1940
Sherif Sabry Pasha, brother of Nazli Sabri, Queen consort of Egypt
Sabry Raheel (born 1987), Egyptian footballer
Abdel Sattar Sabry (born 1974), Egyptian retired footballer
Adham Sabry the main character in Ragol Al Mostaheel series by Nabil Farouk
Ahmed Sabry (1933–1958), Egyptian fencing champion
Ali Sabry, the former Egyptian minister of military production
Ali Sabry, Sri Lankan lawyer and politician 
Hend Sabry (born 1979), Tunisian actress
Ibrahim Sabry, Egyptian archer who participated at the 2010 Summer Youth Olympics in Singapore
Maher Sabry, Egyptian theatre director, playwright, film director, producer and screenwriter, poet, writer and cartoonist
Mazen Hesham Ga Sabry, (born 1994), professional squash player who represented Egypt
Mohanad Saif El Din Sabry (born 1980), Egyptian fencer
Rami Sabry (born 1978), Egyptian singer
Samir Sabry (born 1976), Egyptian former footballer
Sherif Sabry (tennis) (born 1986), Egyptian tennis player

See also
Sabariya
Sabriya